The World Qualification Event was an annual curling tournament first held in 2019 by the World Curling Federation. Eight men's and women's teams who had not already qualified for the World Curling Championships competed for the final two spots in the championships. The event was discontinued for the 2022–23 season with the creation of the new Pan Continental Curling Championships.

Qualification

Eight teams competed in the World Qualification Event:
 Hosting member association
 One team from the Americas Challenge
 Four teams from the European Curling Championships
 Two teams from the Pacific-Asia Curling Championships

Summary

Men

Women

References

International curling competitions
World Curling Federation
World Curling Championships
Recurring sporting events established in 2019
Recurring sporting events disestablished in 2022